Pavitra is a 1986 Telugu-language drama film, produced by B. R. Mohan and K. K. Viswanatham under the Vijaya Lakshmi Art Creations banner and directed by Vinay. It stars Rajendra Prasad, Chandra Mohan and Bhanupriya, with music composed by Krishna-Chakra. The film is a remake of the Tamil film Ingeyum Oru Gangai (1984) and was also remade in Kannada as Prema Gange.

Plot
Pavitra (Bhanupriya) is destitute, who suffers from her drunken father Narasimham (Gollapudi Maruthi Rao) and 3 little siblings. She loves a guy Kishtaiah (Rajendra Prasad), but they are unable to let their relationship since Narasimham asks for a reverse dowry. So, Kishtaiah moves to the city to earn money. Meanwhile, Pavitra's livelihood becomes worse who unable to feed her family. Therefore, she makes a decision, which leads to knitting a rich handicapped benevolent Chandrayya (Chandra Mohan). Right now, Pavitra steps into her in-laws' house where she is suffered by Chandraiah's step-mother Durga (Annapurna), sister Urmila (K. Vijaya) a shrewish woman. Moreover, his brother-in-law Gopalam (Nutan Prasad) a sly keeps an evil eye on Pavitra. Soon after his return, Kishtaiah learns about Pavitra's nuptials, then he becomes a wanderer. During that time, he rescues Chandraiah from danger but gets injured. Therein, Chandrayya 
houses him and circumstances lead Pavitra to lose love again. Being cognizant of it, Chandrayya decides to reunite them. So, he throws Pavitra out by blaming her chastity. But when Kishtaiah & Pavitra realizes the fact, they appreciate the consecration of Chandraiah, and Kishtaiah sends Pavitra back. Finally, the movie ends with Pavitra reaching her husband and Kishtaiah leaving the village.

Cast
Rajendra Prasad as Kishtaiah
Chandra Mohan as Chandraiah
Bhanupriya as Pavitra
Satyanarayana as Raghaiah
Gollapudi Maruthi Rao as Narasimham
Nutan Prasad as Gopalam
Rallapalli as Subbaiah  
Suthi Velu as Appigadu
Annapurna as Durga
K. Vijaya as Urmila  
Jaya Vijaya as Pedda Bujjamma
Kalpana Rai
Y. Vijaya as Chinna Bujjamma

Soundtrack

Music composed by Krishna-Chakra was released through Koneru music label where all lyrics were written by Sirivennela Seetharama Sastry.

References

Indian drama films
Telugu remakes of Tamil films